Incident at Oglala is a 1992 American documentary film directed by Michael Apted and narrated by Robert Redford. The film documents the deaths of two Federal Bureau of Investigation agents, Jack R. Coler and Ronald A. Williams, on the Pine Ridge Indian Reservation on June 26, 1975.  Also killed in the multiple fire was Native American Joe Stuntz, a member of the American Indian Movement (AIM), whose death prompted no legal action.

It examines the legal case surrounding the subsequent trials of Robert Robideau and Dino Butler, and later the separate trial of Leonard Peltier, who had to be extradited from Canada.  Robideau and Butler were acquitted at their trial, but Peltier was convicted of murder in 1977. (Peltier's supporters, including the International Indian Treaty Council, maintain that he is innocent of the crimes.) The film also discusses tribal chairman Dick Wilson.

Background 
There were many unsolved murders and drive-by shootings on the reservation, caused by a culture clash between traditional and Americanized Sioux. The American Indian Movement (AIM) was invited to the reservation to help assert traditional values. It was headquartered at Calvin Jumping Bull's property on the southern edge of Oglala. The "incident at Oglala" was precipitated by the FBI investigation of a pair of stolen boots. Jimmy Eagle, one of the AIM teenagers, was thought to have taken a pair of boots after a fight, and two FBI agents, wanting to talk to him about it, pursued a vehicle they thought he was driving into the AIM camp, leading to a shootout which left both dead.

Accolades
Apted was nominated for the Critics Award in 1992 for the film.

See also
Thunderheart
Wounded Knee incident

References

External links 
 
 
 
 Incident at Oglala at Miramax Films
 Leonard Peltier Defense Committee
 Written Statement from the International Indian Treaty Council to the United Nations Human Rights Commission, January 2002

1992 films
American Indian Movement
Films directed by Michael Apted
Films set in South Dakota
Films shot in South Dakota
Documentary films about Native Americans
Documentary films about indigenous rights
1992 documentary films
Films about activists
Pine Ridge Indian Reservation
Documentary films about South Dakota
1990s English-language films